Loris Hezemans (born 26 May 1997) is a Dutch professional racing driver. He last competed part-time in the NASCAR Cup Series, driving the No. 27 Ford Mustang for Team Hezeberg and part-time in the NASCAR Xfinity Series driving the No. 33 Toyota Supra for Reaume Brothers Racing and part-time in the NASCAR Camping World Truck Series driving the No. 33 for Reaume Brothers Racing. 

He is the 2019 and 2021 champion of the NASCAR Whelen Euro Series. He previously competed in the SEAT León Eurocup, Renault Clio Cup Benelux, TCR International Series, and Blancpain GT Series Sprint Cup. In 2017, he started in the McLaren GT Driver Academy in the Blancpain GT Sprint Series.

Racing career
Hezemans began his career in 2014 in Renault Clio Cup Benelux, where he finished 6th in the standings. In 2015 he switched to the Audi Sport TT Cup, he is currently 7th in the championship standings. That year he also took part in the SEAT León Eurocup, he qualified on pole position for his first-ever race and went on to win the race. In July 2015, it was announced that Hezemans would make his TCR International Series debut with Target Competition driving a SEAT León Cup Racer.

He switched to sports car racing Blancpain GT Series Sprint Cup in 2017, driving for Strakka Racing in a part-time campaign before making his full-time debut for GRT Grasser Racing Team in 2018. Originally scheduled to compete in all races, he ultimately opted to skip the season finale round at Nürburgring to focus on his NASCAR Whelen Euro Series title campaign.

Hezemans made his stock car racing debut in the NASCAR Whelen Euro Series as he became the driver for Hendriks Motorsport in the Elite 1 class. He scored his first pole position at Hockenheim before he picked up his first career win at the same venue on the Saturday race having led the race from the start to the finish. He finished the year fourth in the standings and won the Junior Trophy classification for drivers aged 25 and under to win an opportunity to race in the United States.

Hezemans made his racing debut in the United States the following year when he took part in the 2019 edition of the World Series of Asphalt Stock Car Racing at New Smyrna Speedway, driving for Mike Skinner's team ATF & Gunslinger. He scored three top-five and six top-10 finishes to finish third overall in the Pro Late Model category at the World Series. Later in the year, he would score his first victory in an oval when he won at his home race at Raceway Venray.

On 21 August 2019, it was announced that Hezemans will be making his NASCAR Xfinity Series debut for B. J. McLeod Motorsports at the CTECH Manufacturing 180 in Road America. He finished in 22nd place, with a power steering failure and a crash on the final restart preventing Hezemans from scoring a top-15 finish in his Xfinity Series debut.

In September, Hezemans took the lead in the Euro Series championship after he scored the victory in both races at Hockenheim before he clinched his first Euro Series championship title in October after he started the rain-affected final race of the season at Circuit Zolder. He finished the 2019 season with 4 wins, 6 podium finishes, and 11 top-10 finishes.

An injury to his right hand slightly dampened Hezemans' performance in the early stages of the 2020 NASCAR Whelen Euro Series season. He finished the year in third place after winning the season-opening round at Vallelunga and the season ending round at Valencia.

In 2021, Hezemans would return to the United States to race in the two Xfinity Series races, which would be his first start on ovals. He competed in the races at Phoenix in March and Charlotte in May, both in the No. 13 for MBM Motorsports, which was fielded in a partnership with Reaume Brothers Racing for these races. He also drove for the No. 90 for DGM at Pocono, the No. 33 for Reaume at IRC, No. 66 for MBM at Roval, and the No. 61 for Hattori at Kansas, all were which entries were collaborated with Reaume, except for IRC, in which he drove for Reaume.

In 2022, Hezemans will drive for Team Hezeberg.

Racing record

Complete TCR International Series results
(key) (Races in bold indicate pole position) (Races in italics indicate fastest lap)

† Driver did not finish the race but was classified as he completed over 75% of the race distance.

Complete Blancpain GT Series Sprint Cup results

NASCAR
(key) (Bold – Pole position awarded by qualifying time. Italics – Pole position earned by points standings or practice time. * – Most laps led.)

Cup Series

Xfinity Series

Camping World Truck Series

Whelen Euro Series – EuroNASCAR PRO
(key) (Bold – Pole position. Italics – Fastest lap. * – Most laps led. ^ – Most positions gained)

 Ineligible for series points.

References

External links
 
 
 
 

1997 births
Living people
Dutch racing drivers
Audi Sport TT Cup drivers
SEAT León Eurocup drivers
TCR International Series drivers
ADAC GT Masters drivers
People from Uccle
NASCAR drivers
Racing drivers from Brussels
Strakka Racing drivers
W Racing Team drivers
TCR Europe Touring Car Series drivers